Oberea linearis is a species of beetle in the family Cerambycidae. It was described by Carl Linnaeus in 1761, originally under the genus Cerambyx. It has a wide distribution throughout Europe. It is preyed upon by Opilo pallidus, and serves as a host for the parasitic wasp species Dolichomitus messor and Phaenolobus terebrator. It feeds on Juglans regia, Corylus avellana, Ulmus glabra, Ostrya carpinifolia, and Carpinus betulus. It contains the varietas Oberea linearis var. parallela.

References

Beetles described in 1761
linearis
Taxa named by Carl Linnaeus